Feulen is a commune in central Luxembourg. It is part of the canton of Diekirch, which is part of the district of Diekirch.  The commune's administrative centre is Niederfeulen.

Towns within the commune include Niederfeulen and Oberfeulen.

Population

References

External links
 

Communes in Diekirch (canton)